Abu Muqri (or Miqra) Mohammed ibn Ali al-Battiwi (fl. 1331) was a Moroccan astronomer who wrote a poem on the calendar, astronomy and the determination of the hours of Moslem prayer. According to the German orientalist Carl Brockelmann, al-Battiwi was the commanding general of the Marinid sultan of Morocco, Abu al-Hasan Ali ibn Othman.

He was a native of the Rif region of Morocco.

References

Sources

Further reading
 

Moroccan writers
Medieval Moroccan astronomers
Astronomers of the medieval Islamic world
Year of birth unknown
Year of death unknown
14th-century Moroccan people